Mateusz Kornecki (born 5 June 1994) is a Polish handball player for Industria Kielce and the Polish national team.

He participated at the 2017 World Men's Handball Championship.

References

External links

1994 births
Living people
Polish male handball players
Vive Kielce players
People from Skarżysko County